No Joy (Remix) is an EP by Khanate.  It was only released on 12" records with 300 on red and 1700 on black.

The first track is a remix by James Plotkin of a song from their debut release Khanate. The second track is taken from the recording sessions which spawned their next album (Things Viral).

Track listing
 "No Joy (Remix)"  – 9:50
 "Dead"  – 9:25

Khanate (band) albums
2003 EPs